Heist is a 2001 American heist film written and directed by David Mamet and starring Gene Hackman, Danny DeVito and Delroy Lindo, with Rebecca Pidgeon, Ricky Jay and Sam Rockwell in supporting roles.

Heist received generally positive reviews from critics, with praise for its characters and script. Although it grossed just $28 million against its $39 million production budget, the film became the highest-grossing film directed by Mamet in the United States with $23 million, and went on to become a popular hit in the home video market.

Plot
Joe Moore runs a ring of professional thieves, which includes Bobby Blane, Donnie "Pinky" Pincus and Joe's wife Fran. During a robbery of a New York City jewelry store, Joe's face is captured by a security camera after he takes off his mask in an attempt to distract the store's last remaining employee. As both the picture and a witness can identify him, Joe retires from crime and plans to disappear on his sailboat with his wife.

This does not sit well with Joe's fence, Mickey Bergman, who runs a garment business as a front. After accruing a number of expenses in setting up another robbery, Bergman decides to withhold the payment due to Joe and his crew. He insists they go through with the other job — robbing an airplane carrying a large shipment of gold. Bergman further insists that his nephew, Jimmy Silk, be a part of the crew. Joe accepts, but a series of shifting loyalties changes the complexity of their task, including Jimmy's interest in Joe's wife and Bergman and Jimmy's belief that Joe's skills are declining.

While setting up the plan for the robbery, they are stopped by a passing officer. While Joe and Bobby talk the officer into leaving, an agitated Jimmy draws his gun but is stopped by Pinky. He forces his team out of finishing the job after he finds out that Pinky didn't destroy the getaway car, covered in the team's fingerprints. Bergman does not accept the team's departure and forces them to finish the job.

The plane robbery is a series of misdirects. Pinky poses as a guard while Joe, Bobby and Jimmy pose as airport security personnel. They stop the jet, pretending to be responding to an emergency. They fill a van with what they take from the plane, then move the van to a rented garage on the airport grounds, where they re-brand it and call for a tow truck to have it hauled away.

Jimmy betrays the others to steal the gold and Fran. He knocks out Joe and tells Fran he knew Joe changed the plan. He and Fran take the van, but Jimmy finds out that the hidden compartments are filled with metal washers. Joe avoids arrest and returns to the plane in disguise. He and Bobby remove a shipment of goods they had booked on board the same Swiss flight, which they insist now must be driven to its destination due to the plane's delay. Inside the shipment is the stolen gold, which Joe and Bobby melt into long rods.

Bergman apprehends Pinky, who is walking his niece to the school bus. Pinky discloses the plan in order to save his niece, but he tips Joe with a code word during a phone call and is killed after. Bergman and his crew arrive at Joe's sailboat along with Jimmy and Fran, where they hold Joe at gunpoint. They assume that the boat's golden railings are the gold. Fran leaves with Jimmy, pleading with Bergman to let Joe go. Just as Bergman discovers that the railings are not the gold, a hidden Bobby opens fire. Bergman's men are killed and Joe kills Bergman.

Bobby gives Joe the address to send his share. Joe waits to meet Fran with a truck filled with black-painted rods, but Fran, having switched sides, holds up Joe with Jimmy, taking that truck. Joe gets into a second truck to leave. A black bar in the truck scrapes the garage door, revealing gold underneath. Joe lifts a tarp in the truck bed, revealing the gold rods. He covers the rods with the tarpaulin and drives away.

Cast
 Gene Hackman as Joe Moore
 Danny DeVito as Mickey Bergman
 Delroy Lindo as Bobby Blane
 Rebecca Pidgeon as Fran Moore
 Sam Rockwell as Jimmy Silk
 Ricky Jay as Donnie "Pinky" Pinkus

Production
Franchise Pictures agreed to finance the film as long as it starred Hackman and DeVito. Mamet enjoyed great creative freedom throughout production, because Franchise Pictures did not creatively interfere, only requiring him to finish the film within a certain budget.

The film, set mostly in and around Boston, was shot in Montreal. The opening scene, showcasing a New York jewelry store robbery, was filmed in an Old Montreal building in the process of being renovated into a hotel. The airport scenes, set at Boston's Logan Airport, were filmed at Montréal–Mirabel International Airport.

The film made a profit through international pre-sales before it was finished.

Reception

Critical response
  Audiences polled by CinemaScore gave the film an average grade of "B–" on an A+ to F scale.

Roger Ebert for the Chicago Sun-Times,  wrote, "Heist is the kind of caper movie that was made before special effects replaced wit, construction and intelligence. This movie is made out of fresh ingredients, not cake mix. Despite the twists of its plot, it is about its characters." He went on to praise Mamet's trademark verbal constructions, his restrained approach to on-screen gunplay, and the care that he takes in shaping the relationships between the principals.

Box office
Heist grossed $23.5 million in U.S. and Canada, and $5 million in other territories, for a worldwide total of $28.5 million.

In its opening weekend, the film opened at number 5 and grossed $7.8 million from 1,891 theaters in the United States. It became the highest-grossing Mamet-directed film domestically.

Home video
The film generated more than $72 million in home video rentals in the United States.

Notes

External links

 
 
 

2001 films
2001 crime thriller films
2000s heist films
American crime thriller films
American heist films
Films about con artists
Films directed by David Mamet
Films produced by Art Linson
Films produced by Elie Samaha
Films scored by Theodore Shapiro
Films set in Boston
Films set in New York City
Films shot in Montreal
Films with screenplays by David Mamet
Franchise Pictures films
Morgan Creek Productions films
Warner Bros. films
2000s English-language films
2000s American films